Novokonstantinovka is a rural locality (a selo) in Mirnovsky Selsoviet, Blagovarsky District, Bashkortostan, Russia. The population was 176 as of 2010. There are 2 streets.

Geography 
Novokonstantinovka is located 25 km northwest of Yazykovo (the district's administrative centre) by road. Troitsky is the nearest rural locality.

References 

Rural localities in Blagovarsky District